Janov nad Nisou (until 1947 Honsberk) is a municipality and village in Jablonec nad Nisou District in the Liberec Region of the Czech Republic. It has about 1,500 inhabitants.

Administrative parts
Villages of Hrabětice, Hraničná and Loučná nad Nisou are administrative parts of Janov nad Nisou.

Notable people
Markéta Davidová (born 1997), biathlete; lives here

References

Villages in Jablonec nad Nisou District